Booneville School District may refer to: 

 Booneville School District (Arkansas), based in Booneville, Arkansas.
 Booneville School District (Mississippi), based in Booneville, Mississippi.